Crépy may refer to:

 Crépy, Aisne, a commune of France in the Aisne département
 Crépy, Pas-de-Calais, a commune of France in the Pas-de-Calais département
 Crépy-en-Valois, a commune of France in the Oise département
 Crépy AOC, a French wine appellation in the Savoy wine region
 Simon de Crépy, 11th-century French nobleman
 Etienne Louis Crepy, 18th-century French cartographer